Pterosoma planum is a species of marine gastropod in the family Carinariidae.

References 

 Keen, A. M. (1971). Sea Shells of Tropical West America. Marine mollusks from Baja California to Peru. ed. 2. Stanford University Press. xv, 1064 pp., 22 pls.

External links
 Lesson [R. P.. (1827). Description d'un nouveau genre de mollusques nucléobranches nommé Pterosoma. Mémoires de la Société d'Histoire Naturelle de Paris. (2) 3(3): 414-416]

Animals described in 1827
Carinariidae